Nade Dieu, born on 2 August 1973 in Libramont, France, is a Belgian actress.

Filmography

Film
 1997 : Maigret L'Inspecteur Cadavre
 2002 : The Butterfly by Philippe Muyl
 2002 : Y a pas d'âge pour s’aimer by Thierry Chabert
 2004 : Demain on déménage by Chantal Akerman
 2004 : Notre musique by Jean-Luc Godard
 2006 : Barrage by Raphaël Jacoulot
 2007 : L'Autre Moitié by Rolando Colla
 2008 : Sois sage by Juliette Garcias
 2009 : Un village français as Marie Germain
 2016 : Down by love as The captain
 2018 : Angel Face as Mathilda

TV
 2009–16 : Un village français as Marie
 2017–18 : The Chalet as Mathilde Raynard

References

External links
 

Living people
21st-century Belgian actresses
People from Libramont-Chevigny
1973 births